401 East Ontario is a 515 ft (157m) tall skyscraper in Chicago, Illinois. It was completed in 1990 and has 51 floors. It is tied with One Financial Place as the 78th tallest building in Chicago.

See also
List of tallest buildings in Chicago

References

External links
Official Site

Residential skyscrapers in Chicago
Residential buildings completed in 1990
Residential condominiums in Chicago
1990 establishments in Illinois
Streeterville, Chicago